Ercole amante (Hercules in Love, French: Hercule amoureux) is an opera in a prologue and five acts by Francesco Cavalli. Its Italian libretto is by Francesco Buti, based on Sophocles' The Trachiniae and on the ninth book of Ovid's Metamorphoses. The first performance took place on 7 February 1662 in the Salle des Machines of the Tuileries in Paris.

Background
Cardinal Mazarin commissioned the opera to celebrate the June 1660 wedding of Louis XIV and Maria Theresa of Spain, but preparations for the staging were on a grand scale and caused a twenty-month delay, irritating the composer. Worse for him, eighteen ballet entrées and intermèdes with music by Isaac de Benserade and Jean-Baptiste Lully were inserted, mostly at the ends of Cavalli's acts, to cater to French taste. These were not merely diversions but also served to further the plot, and in the event they met with greater approval from the audience than Ercole amante itself, helping boost Lully's position at the French court.

Performance history
After its premiere the opera was given another seven times: 14 and 18 February; 18, 22, 25, and 29 April; and 6 May. The theatre was built specifically to present the opera, and if the construction costs of the theatre are included, it was the most expensive of the French court's theatrical productions mounted up to that point.

Roles

References
Notes

Sources

External links
 

1662 operas
Heracles in fiction
Operas by Francesco Cavalli
Operas
Operas based on classical mythology
Operas based on works by Sophocles
Operas based on Metamorphoses